The champions of Belgium in women's football today are the Super League winners, a league of seven teams created in 2015.

Previously the title was awarded to the play-off winners of the regional leagues (1972–1973), the winners of the First Division (1974–2012) and the best placed Belgian team of the cross-border BeNe League with the Netherlands.

Clubs were actually crowned Belgian champions as early as in the 1920s and 1930s. The first championship of the modern era was won by Astro Begijnendijk (now KSK Heist) in 1972 and the most titles today have been won by Standard Liège with 20 titles.

The early years (1920/30s)
The first women's football club in Belgium was the Brussels Feminina Club created in August 1921. Several others followed, but then in 1922 the Royal Belgian Football Association banned all women's football clubs. Nevertheless, women's football flourished and the club Atalante de Jette even played national team from France and Great Britain.

First Division (1972–2012)
The championship was first contested in 1972. It was played in three divisions. After the season the three division winners met in a three-round group to play for the championship. In 1973 four divisional winners met in a two-legged semi-final and a one-off final. In both years Astro Begijnendijk were victorious. Since 1974 the league was played in a single division as double round robin with no play-offs.

From 1977 a national cup was played, the Beker van België (Belgian Women's Cup).

Key

BeNe League (2013–2015)
The BeNe League was played three seasons, it consisted of eight Belgian and eight Dutch clubs. The title of Belgian champions and the associated UEFA Women's Champions League spot, were given to the best placed Belgian team after the season.

The only Belgian side playing for the top spots were Standart Liège, finishing runners-up to Twente twice before winning the league in 2014–15. The second best Belgian team was ranked 6th or worse at the end of the season.  The BeNe League initiative was ended because Dutch clubs and the Dutch FA failed to come to an agreement regarding the clubs' financial participation for the following seasons. The Dutch FA also questioned the lack of competitiveness.

Super League (2015–present)
The Super League Vrouwenvoetbal was created in 2015, after the BeNe League was stopped. In the 2015-16 inaugural season, eight teams participated. In contrast to the First Division the format changed from a double round robin to a two staged season. Teams played a double round-robin in the first stage. After that points were halved and the top four placed and bottom placed teams played another double round-robin for a total of 20 games.

After the 2015–16 season, Lierse chose not to participate, dropping the league to seven members for 2016–17. The two-stage season was abandoned, and each team now plays the others four times for a total of 24 games.

Championships won by club
The championships have been won by ten different clubs.

See also
 Belgian football champions

References

 
Belgium
cham
cham